The dark-capped bulbul (Pycnonotus tricolor) is a member of the bulbul family of passerine birds. It is found in central, eastern and south-eastern Africa.

Taxonomy and systematics
The dark-capped bulbul was originally described in the genus Ixos. Some authorities treat the dark-capped bulbul as a subspecies of the common bulbul. Alternate names include the black-eyed bulbul, brown-capped bulbul, garden bulbul, Kenya Highlands dark-capped bulbul, Ngami dark-capped bulbul, tricoloured bulbul and white-eared geelgat.

Subspecies
Three subspecies are recognized:
 P. t. spurius Reichenow, 1905 — Originally described as a separate species. Found in southern Ethiopia
 East Coast black-capped bulbul P. t. layardi Gurney, 1879 — Originally described as a separate species. Found from south-eastern Kenya to eastern and southern Zambia, north-eastern Botswana and South Africa
 P. t. tricolor (Hartlaub, 1862) — Found from eastern Cameroon to Democratic Republic of Congo, southern Sudan, western and central Kenya, Angola, north-western Botswana, and northern and western Zambia

Description

The dark-capped bulbul is mostly greyish brown above and whitish brown below, with a distinctive dark head and pointy crest on top of the head.  The back of the head merges into the brown of the back, and the chin is also blackish. The underparts are grey-brown apart from white around the vent (yellow in P. t. tricolor). It is about 18 cm in length, with a long tail. It has a dark brown head and upperparts. Sexes are similar in plumage.

Vocalizations

References

External links

 Black-eyed Bulbul - Species text in The Atlas of Southern African Birds.

dark-capped bulbul
Birds of Sub-Saharan Africa
dark-capped bulbul